Thomas Foston  was a Master of University College, Oxford, England.

Foston was a mature commoner and Fellow of University College. As senior Fellow of the College, he became Master in 1393, ratified by the Chancellor of Oxford University for two years, and remained in the post until 1396.

References

Year of birth unknown
Year of death unknown
Alumni of University College, Oxford
Fellows of University College, Oxford
Masters of University College, Oxford
14th-century English people
14th-century scholars